John Pelosi (born 29 February 1956) is a Scottish former footballer, who played for St Johnstone, Hamilton Academical, Kilmarnock, Queen of the South and Stenhousemuir. He is most famous for having been sued by a fellow footballer, Jim Brown, for a foul tackle which ended his opponent's career. Brown settled out of court a year later.

References

Sources

1956 births
Living people
Footballers from Glasgow
Scottish footballers
Association football wingers
Scottish Football League players
Glasgow Perthshire F.C. players
St Johnstone F.C. players
Hamilton Academical F.C. players
Kilmarnock F.C. players
Queen of the South F.C. players
Stenhousemuir F.C. players
Scottish Junior Football Association players